= Master of the Sienese Straus Madonna =

Italian painter

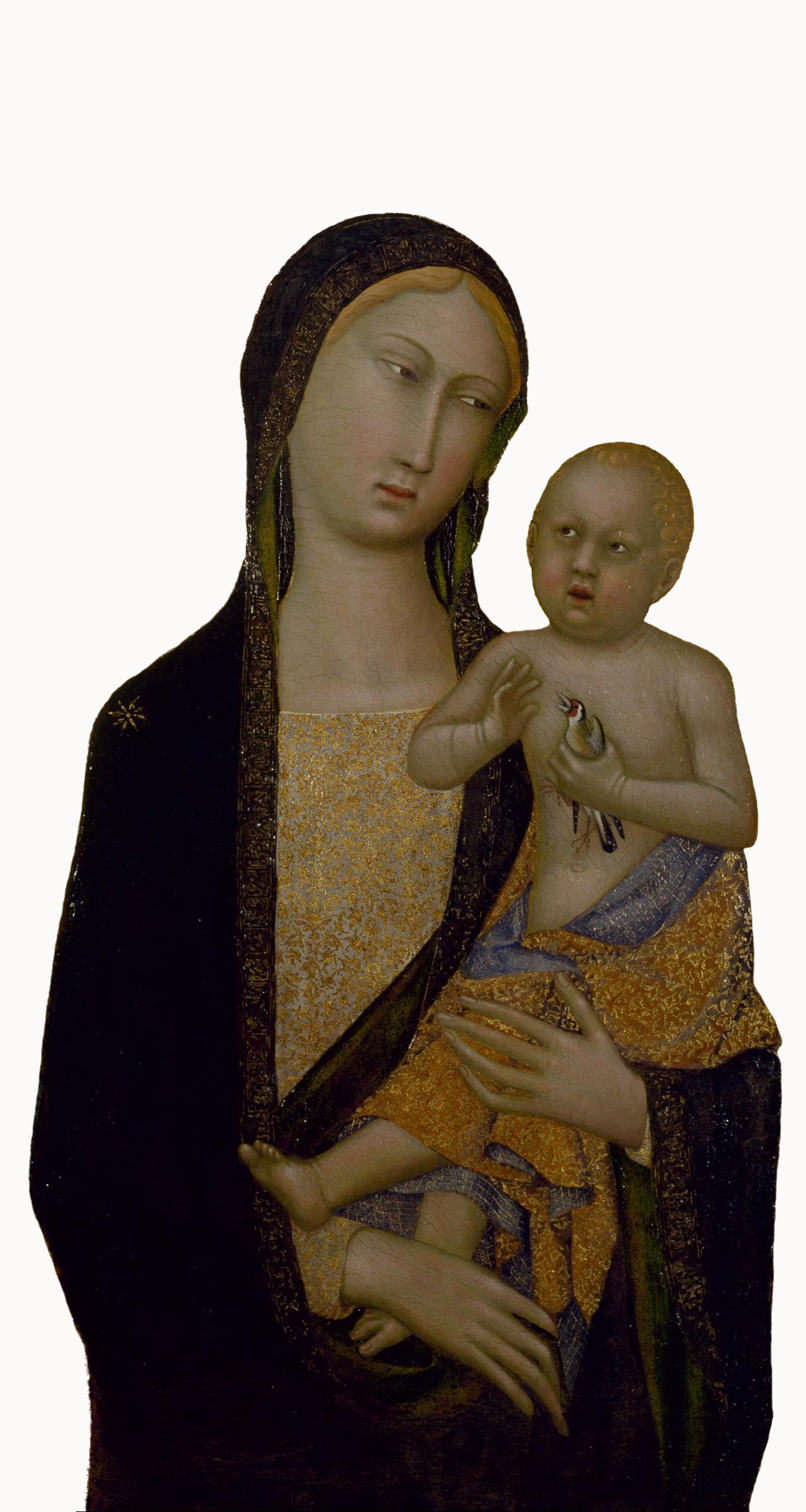
Virgin and Child in the MFAH for which the master is named

The Master of the Sienese Straus Madonna (active c. 1340 – 1360), was an Italian painter.

== Biography ==
He was active in Siena and is named after a depiction of a Madonna and Child donated by the Straus family to the Museum of Fine Arts, Houston. He is considered to be the same person as Master of the Ashmolean Crucifixion.
